Ceylon (in which renamed Sri Lanka earlier this year) competed at the 1972 Summer Olympics in Munich, West Germany. Four competitors, all men, took part in six events in two sports.

Athletics

Men's 100 metres
Sunil Gunawardene
 First Heat — 11.00s (→ did not advance)
 Lucien Rosa
 Wickramesinghe Wimaladasa

Shooting

One shooter represented Ceylon in 1972.

50 m rifle, prone
 Daya Rajasinghe Nadarajasingham

References

External links
Official Olympic Reports

Nations at the 1972 Summer Olympics
1972
Olympics
1972 in Sri Lankan sport